Gunston Street is a weekly comic strip that is written and illustrated by Basil Zaviski. The main character Phil, is based on Basil's father Phillip Zaviski, who served with Basil in the same National Guard Unit for over 7 years. Although the main character is based on his father, the strips are that of Basil Zaviski's experiences. The heavy leaning storyline of the main character "Phil" tends to focus on the life and times of your average Army National Guardsman and their daily struggles with deployments, family and combat.

Basil Zaviski served over 15 years with the same National Guard unit, Co.F 425th Airborne Infantry (LRS) "Long Range Surveillance", and was deployed to Iraq for 15 months spanning 2004. The comic strip has been around since 1991, and has been reportedly rejected by syndicates for being niche, claiming that the average reader cannot connect with the military theme. Zaviski's reply,"That's fine with me. I see my job as giving the
troops entertainment, not pleasing the syndicates. I enjoy what I do, and who I do it for."

Publishers
 Stars and Stripes (? - Present)
 New Patriot EANGUS

Video
 Recon Comic Relief

References

 Stars & Stripes

External links
 
 New Patriot EANGUS
 Stars & Stripes

American comic strips
Military humor